Senator Brennan may refer to:

James B. Brennan (1926–1999), Wisconsin State Senate
John A. Brennan Jr. (born 1945), Massachusetts State Senate
Michael F. Brennan (born 1953), Maine State Senate
Vincent M. Brennan (1890–1959), Michigan State Senate
William C. Brennan (1918–2000), New York State Senate